Sinkhorn's theorem states that every square matrix with positive entries can be written in a certain standard form.

Theorem
If A is an n × n matrix with strictly positive elements, then there exist diagonal matrices D1 and D2 with strictly positive diagonal elements such that D1AD2 is doubly stochastic. The matrices D1 and D2 are unique modulo multiplying the first matrix by a positive number and dividing the second one by the same number.

Sinkhorn–Knopp algorithm
A simple iterative method to approach the double stochastic matrix is to alternately rescale all rows and all columns of A to sum to 1. Sinkhorn and Knopp presented this algorithm and analyzed its convergence.
This is essentially the same as the Iterative proportional fitting algorithm, well known in survey statistics.

Analogues and extensions
The following analogue for unitary matrices is also true: for every unitary matrix U there exist two diagonal unitary matrices L and R such that LUR has each of its columns and rows summing to 1.

The following extension to maps between matrices is also true (see Theorem 5 and also Theorem 4.7): given a Kraus operator
that represents the quantum operation Φ mapping a density matrix into another,

that is trace preserving,

and, in addition, whose range is in the interior of the positive definite cone (strict positivity), there exist scalings xj, for j in {0,1}, that are positive definite so that the rescaled Kraus operator

is doubly stochastic. In other words, it is such that both,

as well as for the adjoint,

where I denotes the identity operator.

Applications
In the 2010s Sinkhorn's theorem came to be used to find solutions of entropy-regularised optimal transport problems. This has been of interest in machine learning because such "Sinkhorn distances" can be used to evaluate the difference between data distributions and permutations. This improves the training of machine learning algorithms, in situations where maximum likelihood training may not be the best method.

References

Matrix theory
Theorems in linear algebra